, or simply Crypton, is a Japanese media company based in Sapporo, Japan. It develops, imports, and sells products for music, such as sound generator software, sampling CDs and DVDs, and sound effect and background music libraries. The company also provides services of online shopping, online community, and mobile content.

Overview 

Crypton started business importing audio products in 1995, and has been involved in the development, import, and sales of sampling CDs and DVDs, sound effect and background music libraries, and musical synthesizer applications. Its main business partners in Japan include musical instrument shops, computer stores, and software distributors.

The company has licensed software to the following organizations:
 Video game publishers, such as Konami, Sega, Sony Interactive Entertainment, Bandai Namco Entertainment, and Nintendo
 Public and private broadcasting media (TV, radio, and cable), such as NHK
 Computer software and hardware companies, such as Apple Inc., Dell, and Microsoft
 Musical instrument makers, such as Roland Corporation and Yamaha Corporation
 Public institutions, such as local governments, the Ministry of Defense, and the Ministry of Education, Culture, Sports, Science and Technology
 Educational institutions, such as high schools, universities, and vocational schools

Crypton also operates a number of Japanese mobile websites, mainly for i-mode of NTT docomo, EZweb of au by KDDI, and Yahoo! Keitai of SoftBank Mobile, to distribute ringtones, sound effects, and voice ringtones (chaku-voice), including:
 Hatsune Miku Mobile 
 Pocket Sound Effect Pro
 Mazeteyo Nama Voice

Crypton imports products from more than 50 international suppliers based in Austria, Canada, Denmark, France, Germany, Hungary, Italy, Russia, South Africa, South Korea, Sweden, Switzerland, the United Kingdom, and the United States.

In 2010, Crypton Future Media were announced as the No. 1 company for sound-related software, bringing a share of 21.4% of the market for their related product.

Vocaloid products and services 

Crypton is best known for production and sales of speech synthesis software for computer music. Its products use the Vocaloid singing synthesis engine developed by Yamaha Corporation; they were also charged with finding and contacting English studios in order to gain recommendations for the English version of the Vocaloid software. The company released Meiko in 2004 and Kaito in 2006, who were originally developed by Yamaha leaving the commercial release to Crypton Future Media. The company then released the first Vocaloid developed by them, and member of the official Character Vocal Series, Hatsune Miku, which used the upgraded engine Vocaloid 2.  The success of the Hatsune Miku Voicebank in Japan (and later in other countries) greatly raised Crypton's profile. The second Character Vocal Series are Kagamine Rin and Len and the third Megurine Luka. Because the popularity of these Vocaloids grew, Crypton launched the website Piapro to upload fan-made content and its own music label KarenT to sell Vocaloid songs.

On 31 August 2019, it was confirmed that Crypton ceased releasing new Vocaloid products on Yamaha's synthesis engine and Cubase editor. Instead, they will release new "Vocaloid" products on their newly-developed Piapro Studio engine-editor with the name NT (New Type) once Crypton has removed compatibility with the Cubase editor for their speech synthesis products.

Vocaloid products 

Kaito was the only one sold using the Vocaloid 1.1 engine; the previous Vocaloids before him were sold as Vocaloid 1.0, which he was also supplied with. However, he needed the additional Vocaloid 1.1.2 patch to work on the Vocaloid 1.0 engine. A patch was later released to update all Vocaloid engines to Vocaloid 1.1.2, adding new features to the software, although there were differences between the output results of the engine. Even though Kaito and Meiko were Japanese and sung using Japanese phonetics, the main interface was written using English for both English and Japanese Vocaloids.

Due to the success of placing a character on the box art of Meiko, the concept was carried over to her successor Kaito and later Vocaloids to encourage creativity, however neither Vocaloid's box art originally had the intention to represent that Vocaloid. Though Meiko experienced good sales, Kaito was the only one who initially failed commercially, causing less demand for male voices for a while after Kaito's initial release. However, sales eventually picked up and Kaito later won the Nico Nico Douga second best seller award of 2008. Meiko and Kaito are reported to be in discussion for an update. Several updated vocal expressions have already been recorded for Kaito.
In April 2011, it was confirmed six vocal expressions had been recorded for Kaito, two of which were dropped and the remaining four were being brought forward with one having reached alpha stage already. The Character Vocal (Hatsune Miku, Kagamine Rin/Len and Megurine Luka) series Appends had been created from vocal performances of their voice providers, however the new Kaito Appends were created by adding echo, force and tension to the samples.

Vocaloid 2 products 

Crypton released Hatsune Miku, on August 31, 2007. The second of the Character Vocal Series is the first dual Vocaloid Kagamine Len and Kagamine Rin, a Japanese male and female, released on December 27, 2007. On July 18, 2008, the updated edition of Kagamine Rin and Len, named "act2" was released. For a period of time, users who had bought the old version were allowed to get the new version for free. On June 18, 2008, beta demonstration songs using the new version were released on the company's official blog. The expansion disc is an entirely different software and does not affect the original Kagamine Rin/Len installation in any way, giving the user options to either use the old or new voice sets exclusively or combine their usage. Crypton Future Media have now retired the sale of their old Kagamine Vocaloid and it is now no longer possible to buy the software from them. This was also the very first Vocaloid update to be done for any Vocaloid. The third product of Crypton's Character Vocal Series is Megurine Luka, the first bilingual Vocaloid.

On April 30, 2010, an updated version of Miku called Hatsune Miku Append was released containing a package of six different tones of Miku's voice: Soft (gentle, delicate voice), Sweet (young, chibi voice), Dark (mature, heartbroken-like voice), Vivid (bright, cheerful voice), Solid (loud, clear voice), and Light (innocent, heavenly voice). Crypton Future Media also released Kagamine Rin/Len Append on December 27, 2010.

Released products

Vocaloid 2 products 

Crypton has a "Project if..." with a mysterious, childlike voice.
Crypton has also done some work on a "CV04" with a male voice

Vocaloid 3 products

According to Crypton, a petition started on Facebook exceeded the needed 39,390 members in November 2010 to join Hatsune Miku's account for an English version to be released; Crypton announced that they were working on an English Miku and was planned to be released in 2013. Hatsune Miku English was released on August 31, 2013. Hatsune Miku V3 was released September 26, 2013.

Vocaloid 4 products

Piapro
In response to the growing popularity of derivative works created with Hatsune Miku and the other Vocaloid applications, Crypton opened an online community Piapro (stylized as PIAPRO) on December 3, 2007. Vocaloid fans can upload their own content, such as music, art, lyrics, characters, and 3D models to the platform. "Piapro" stands for peer production and promotes consumer generated media.

Also under the Piapro brand is Crypton's Piapro Studio, a Vocaloid vocal editor implemented as a VST/AU plugin bundled with all of their full V3 Vocaloid products (Miku V3, Miku V3 English, Miku V3 Bundle, Meiko V3, Kaito V3). This allows for full vocal editing functionality nearly identical in feature support to Yamaha's full Vocaloid 3 Editor software, which is available either as a standalone application or a plugin for Cubase. All Vocaloid 3 voice libraries include the Tiny Vocaloid 3 Editor for free, however this is severely limited in functionality compared to the full V3 editor - serving mainly as a beginner's taste of Vocaloid editing or a way to easily test out a new vocal library. Piapro Studio was created to allow owners of Crypton's V3 products to have a fully featured vocal editor with a modernized and streamlined interface bundled free of charge. It also allows for the loading of 3rd-party, non-Crypton Vocaloid 3 voicebanks - as well as V2's that have been imported into the full V3 editor beforehand. Being a VST plugin, it allows the user to operate entirely within their DAW of choice, in contrast to the tiny or full V3 editors which are standalone applications and the user must export a wav to import into their DAW each time a change or update is needed - or export an updated wav file from their DAW as the background music to import into the V3 editor allowing for convenient editing and a smoother workflow. Currently Piapro Studio lacks some features of the full V3 editor, but most of these are not needed to work with the vocal composition and tuning of the Vocaloid. Crypton however has mentioned they would like to implement something similar to Job Plugins at some point in the future.

Piapro Studio is also regularly updated every few months with new features and bug fixes. Vocaloid 3 Editor updates appear much less frequently, generally only around the time of release of a new Vocaloid. Piapro Studio also features some Piapro social designed singer icons and vocal preview samples, added in an update in the Summer of 2014.

See also 
 Vocaloid
 Meiko
 Kaito
 Hatsune Miku
 Kagamine Rin/Len
 Megurine Luka
 Speech synthesis
 Computer music
 Auto-Tune

Further reading

References

External links 
  
  

 Piapro 
 KarenT

Mass media companies of Japan
Software companies of Japan
Companies based in Sapporo
Japanese companies established in 1995
Mass media companies established in 1995
Vocaloid production companies
Mass media in Sapporo